Dr Pashupati Mandal was an Indian politician. He was elected to the 3rd and 4th Lok Sabha, lower house of the Parliament of India from Vishnupur, West Bengal  as member of the Indian National Congress.

Earlier he was the member of 1st and 2nd Lok Sabha from Bankura seat.

References

External links
Official biographical sketch in Parliament of India website

People from Bankura district
India MPs 1952–1957
India MPs 1957–1962
India MPs 1962–1967
India MPs 1967–1970
Lok Sabha members from West Bengal
Indian National Congress politicians
Year of birth missing
Year of death missing